Puyi Township is a township under the administration of Yangshuo County, Guangxi, China. , it administers Puyi Street Residential Neighborhood and the following eight villages:
Puyi Village
Shangguan Village
Muqiao Village
Liugong Village
Yong Village
Gule Village
Shangyou Village
Dashan Village

References 

Townships of Guilin
Yangshuo County